There You Have It is the commercial mixtape by American rapper Reason. It was released on May 19, 2017, and later re-released on September 28, 2018, by Top Dawg Entertainment. The album includes guest features from Xian Bell, D Beezey and Space 600. The production came from beats the rapper found on YouTube from producers SWI$H, Kampo, YONDO Beats, Nikko Bunkin, Tropical Gameboy, Deafh Beats, Classic Beats, Theopolis, Dmusic605, and Marqell O'Connor.

Background
Before signing to Top Dawg Entertainment, the album was originally released on May 19, 2017, and the label later decided to re-release the album. Describing his first meeting with TDE, Reason said:

When discussing his different experiences with label meetings, Reason said "Every meeting, all they talked about was my social media, my YouTube numbers, my SoundCloud numbers, and then we would play music for six minutes and that would be it, Top did not bring those things up once, and we played music for an hour and a half, and we see where TDE is."

Singles and promotion
On August 8, it was announced that he was signed to TDE. That same day, he released a promotional single titled "The Soul", with a music video released the next week. On August 29, he released the first single titled "Better Dayz", a song that had already made an appearance on his first mixtape. On September 11, he released the second single titled "Summer Up", also accompanied by a music video. He is also scheduled to go on tour with Jay Rock on the "Big Redemption Tour".

Critical reception
Upon release of the album, HotNewHipHop said "This album is thoroughly enjoyable, and beyond some occasional rigidity in his voice, Reason sounds at home in the booth. More often than not he raps with the urgency of a man trying to keep his head above water and given the content of the music he creates it makes sense. Not only is his music about surviving the struggle, but it's simultaneously easy on the ear, which isn't always an easy feat to accomplish. [...] With the new resources at his disposal and Top Dawg's guidance, Reason is sure to be crafting a slew of new music and I'm looking forward to hearing what his proper first album under the TDE banner will sound like."

Track listing

References

2018 debut albums
Reason (rapper) albums
Top Dawg Entertainment albums